Poonam Narula is an Indian television actress. She is known for her roles in Shararat and Kasautii Zindagii Kay. In 2005, she participated in Nach Baliye 1 and became the 1st runner-up.

Career 
Poonam started her career on television after taking acting lessons from Ashok Kumar’s acting academy in Mumbai. She was seen in Star Plus TV show Shararat where she played one of the female lead roles in the sitcom. Within a short span of her entry, she won the hearts of TV audiences and then she was offered TV shows by Balaji Telefilms' Itihaas, Kasautii Zindagii Kay, Mano Ya Na Mano, Kaahin Kissii Roz, Kkusum and Kahaani Ghar Ghar Kii.

Personal life 
Poonam married actor Manish Goel in 2002. Together, they have a son and a daughter.

Television

Awards

References 

Living people
Year of birth missing (living people)